{{DISPLAYTITLE:C19H22N2O3}}
The molecular formula C19H22N2O3 (molar mass: 326.39 g/mol, exact mass: 326.1630 u) may refer to:

 Bumadizone
 25CN-NBOMe